Xylophragma is a genus of flowering plants in the family Bignoniaceae, native to dry forests of Mexico, Central America, Trinidad and northern South America. They are lianas or scandent shrubs.

Species
Currently accepted species include:

Xylophragma harleyi (A.H.Gentry ex M.M.Silva & L.P.Queiroz) L.G.Lohmann
Xylophragma heterocalyx (Bureau & K.Schum.) A.H.Gentry
Xylophragma myrianthum (Cham.) Sprague
Xylophragma platyphyllum (DC.) L.G.Lohmann
Xylophragma pratense (Bureau & K.Schum.) Sprague
Xylophragma seemannianum (Kuntze) Sandwith
Xylophragma tenue Kaehler
Xylophragma unifoliolatum J.F.Morales & Q.Jiménez

References

Bignoniaceae
Bignoniaceae genera